The First Secretary of the Nakhchivan regional branch of the Communist Party of the Soviet Union was the position of highest authority in the Nakhchivan ASSR in the Azerbaijan SSR of the Soviet Union. The position was created in 1920, and abolished in August 1991. The First Secretary was a de facto appointed position usually by the Politburo or the General Secretary himself.

List of First Secretaries of the Communist Party of Nakhchivan

See also
Nakhchivan Autonomous Soviet Socialist Republic

Notes

Sources
 World Statesmen.org

Regional Committees of the Communist Party of the Soviet Union
History of Nakhchivan
1920 establishments in Russia
1991 disestablishments in the Soviet Union